"Ich bin ein Auslander" (German for 'I am a foreigner', correct spelling ) is a single by Pop Will Eat Itself released in 1994 from the album Dos Dedos Mis Amigos. The song peaked at number 28 on the UK Singles Chart in 1994. The song's lyrics refer to English attitudes towards immigration.

References

Pop Will Eat Itself songs
1994 singles
1994 songs
Infectious Records singles
Interscope Records singles
Nothing Records singles
Songs against racism and xenophobia
Songs written by Clint Mansell